Daniel Berta was the defending champion, but he lost in the first round against Junior A. Ore.
Agustín Velotti won the title after defeating Andrea Collarini in the final, 6–4, 7–5.

Seeds

Draw

Final eight

Top half

Section 1

Section 2

Bottom half

Section 3

Section 4

References
Main Draw

Boys' Singles
2010